Egesina shibatai is a species of beetle in the family Cerambycidae. It was described by Masao Hayashi in 1962.

References

Egesina
Beetles described in 1962